Kolding is a Danish seaport in Southern Denmark. 

Kolding may also refer to:

 Kolding (horse), a New Zealand-bred racehorse
 Kolding (surname), a list of people with the surname
 Kolding cog, a shipwreck found in 1943
 Kolding FC, an association football club based in Kolding, Denmark
 Kolding Fjord, a fjord in Denmark
 Kolding Gymnasium, a school in Denmark
 Kolding IF, an association football club based in Kolding, Denmark
 Kolding IF Women, an association football club based in Kolding, Denmark
 Kolding Municipality, a municipality in Denmark
 Kolding Storcenter, a shopping mall in Denmark
 Battle of Kolding (disambiguation), multiple battles between Denmark and other countries
 KIF Kolding, a handball club based in Kolding, Denmark 
 Vejle Boldklub Kolding, a Danish association football club